The following is a list of notable cricket players who died while playing a game, died directly from injuries sustained while playing, or died after being taken ill on the ground.

References

 
Cricket-related lists
Cricket